Giry may refer to:

People
 Arthur Giry (1848–1899), French historian
 Louis Giry (1596–1665), French lawyer, translator and writer
 Odet-Joseph Giry (1699–1761), French clergyman
 Sylvie Giry-Rousset (born 1965), French cross-country skier

Places
 Giry, Nièvre, France

Fictional characters
 Madame Giry, from The Phantom of the Opera
 Meg Giry, from The Phantom of the Opera